The following is a list of Fangoria Chainsaw Award winners for Best Actress.  It is awarded annually to an actress for her work in a horror or thriller film.

Winners and nominees

1990s

2000s

2010s

2020s

References

A
Film awards for lead actress